Rainer Schmidt may refer to:

 Rainer Schmidt (ski jumper) (born 1948), German ski jumper
 Rainer Schmidt (landscape architect) (born 1954), German landscape architect
 Rainer Schmidt (table tennis) (born 1965), German para table tennis player
 Rainer Schmidt (violinist) (born 1964), German violinist